The Space Applications Centre (SAC) is an institution of research in Ahmedabad under the aegis of the Indian Space Research Organisation (ISRO). It is one of the major centres of ISRO that is engaged in the research, development and demonstration of applications of space technology in the field of telecommunications, remote sensing, meteorology and satellite navigation (Sat Nav). This includes research and development of on-board systems, ground systems and end user equipment hardware and software. SAC has three campuses, two of which are located at Ahmedabad and one at Delhi.

Achievements 

Some of the achievements of the Space Applications Centre include development of communication and meteorological payloads for INSAT satellites, optical and microwave payloads for IRS satellites. SAC provides its infrastructure to conduct training courses to the students of the Center for Space Science and Technology Education in Asia and The Pacific (CSSTEAP). It was founded by Dr. Vikram Sarabhai. 

On 19 March 2021, SAC in a major breakthrough demonstrated free space quantum communication technology at a distance of 300 meters between two buildings through live video conferencing as part of Quantum Experiments using Satellite Technology (QuEST) project. The primary objective is to successfully perform satellite based quantum communication between two ISRO ground station. Hardware developed for performing the experiment includes NavIC receiver for time synchronization between transmitter and receiver, gimbal mechanism systems as an alternative to large aperture telescope for optical alignment.

Collaborations between SAC Ahmedabad and National Institute of Design, Gujarat began in the early 1970s.

References

External links 
 Space Applications Centre website
 ISRO SAC page
 CSSTEAP website

1972 establishments in Gujarat
Research institutes in Ahmedabad
Research institutes established in 1972
Space programme of India
Space technology research institutes
Research institutes in Gujarat